Brittany Lauda (born February 18, 1993) is an American voice actress and voice director who has appeared in English-language dubs of Japanese anime and video games. Her debut role was in Queen's Blade Rebellion, where she voiced Mirim.

Biography 
Lauda has been involved in many productions for Media Blasters. Some of her major roles are Ichigo in Darling in the Franxx, Yuzuriha Ogawa in Dr. Stone, Plug Cryostat in Fight Ippatsu! Jūden-chan!!, Audrey Belrose in HuniePop, Cammot in Holy Knight, Riko in Made in Abyss, and Ui Wakana the title character in My Wife is the Student Council President. She and fellow voice director Melanie Ehrlich had a production company called MB VoiceWorks which worked on the dub for Holy Knight and casting for Ladies versus Butlers. She graduated from Harborfields High School in Greenlawn, New York, and the State University of New York at Geneseo with a Bachelor of Arts degree in history. She has also been an active cosplayer at anime and science fiction conventions under the name Bree Faith.

Personal life 
Lauda married Matt Shipman on July 7, 2018. On June 6, 2020, she made a post on Twitter stating she is pansexual.

Lauda is gender-nonconforming, genderqueer and goes by any pronouns.

Filmography

Anime

Video games

Notes

References

External links
 
 
 
 

American voice actors
American video game actors
American casting directors
Women casting directors
American voice directors
Living people
State University of New York at Geneseo alumni
21st-century American actors
People from Geneseo, New York
Actors from New York City
Cosplayers
Pansexual actors
Twitch (service) streamers
21st-century LGBT people
People with non-binary gender identities
Pansexual non-binary people
American non-binary actors
1993 births